Democrats for Education Reform (DFER) is a New York-based political action committee which focuses on encouraging the Democratic Party to support public education reform and charter schools.

History
DFER emerged around the same time as the Education Equality Project. Whitney Tilson and Kevin P. Chavous are among the group's co-founders.

Positions
DFER claims to support five policy areas: resource equity, teacher quality and preparation, accountability, public school choice, and higher ed quality and affordability. In 2018, the Colorado Democratic Party asked the Colorado DFER chapter to stop using "Democrats" in its name.

Leadership
Shavar Jeffries, one of the charter school sector's most prominent Black leaders, became the president of the organization in 2015.

Activities
In Washington D.C., DFER sent out attack ads against Janeese Lewis George, a progressive candidate for D.C. city council. After conducting polling that showed voters were concerned about crime, DFER ran mailers that claimed that George would defund the police. After the election, DFER apologized for its efforts.

References

External links
 Democrats for Education Reform website

Democratic Party (United States) organizations